Techno India Group Public School Balurghat, or Balurghat Techno India Group Public School. or TIGPS, Balurghat is an English medium co-ed school following CBSE in Balurghat, West Bengal, India. The classes range from Pre-school playgroup to Class XII. However, for the academic year 2012–2013 it has classes up to X. There are almost 600 students in the school.

Affiliation
west bengal board of education the following board of TIGPS, Balurghat. WB-based examinations are held in the academics session.

Academics
The school has different subjects for each age group:
For Playgroup classes: English, Rhymes, Maths
For Kindergarten and Nursery classes: English, Bengali/Hindi, Maths, Science
For classes 1, 2: English, Bengali/Hindi, Maths, Science, Computer Science
For classes 3, 4: English, Bengali/Hindi, Maths, Science, Computer Science, Social Science (History, Geography)
For class 5: English, Bengali, Hindi, Maths, Science, Computer Science, Social Science (History, Geography)
For classes 6, 7, 8: English, Bengali, Hindi, Maths, Science, Computer Science, Social Science (History, Geography, Civics), E.V.S.
For class 9: English, Bengali/Hindi, Maths, Science, Information Technology, Social Sciences (History, Geography, Pol. Sci., economics), E.V.S.
For class 10: English, Bengali/Hindi, Maths, Science, Information Technology, Social Sciences (History, Geography, Pol. Sci., Economics), E.V.S.

The school conducts four formative assessments and two summative assessments per year. It follows the new CCE (Comprehensive and Compulsory Examinations) scheme for academics. Special audio/visual classes are taken for every class regularly.

Co-curricular activities
Extracurricular classes include dance or music and sports like cricket, football, badminton, carrom and table tennis. Specialised coaching is given to boys and girls in cricket and football. Workshops are held in the vacations to enrich students' knowledge.

Houses
The students are divided into four competing houses — Teresa House (Blue), Tagore House (Green), Vivekananda House (Orange), Netaji House (Red). Competitions are held every year among the houses which include debate, elocution, dance, music, science quiz, and sports like cricket, football, kho kho, kabaddi, badminton and others. Netaji House were the champions from 2010 to 2012. Vivekananda House won it in 2013.

Performances outside school 
TIGPS Balurghat has won prizes for performances outside the school. 

It won first prize in dance in 2010 and 2011, 3rd prize in 2012, and 2nd prize in the Republic Day Celebrations at Balurghat Stadium. From 2011 to 2013 it won the first prize in Tableau. It thus made a record of Hattrick in Tableau in the Republic Day Celebrations. very bad school

Carnival 
In the Carnival of TIG 2008, Balurghat won 6 medals (1 gold,2 silvers and 3 bronzes) and became 4th among all TIGPS schools. In the Memory Test, Balurghat became the most successful among all schools, collecting all the three medals — Gold, Silver and Bronze.

In the next Carnival in 2010, Balurghat came to be second, after TIGPS, Hooghly. Balurghat won 6 medals (along with 2 third positions). The Medal tally consisted of 2 golds,4 silvers and 2 third positions.

Balurghat Techno has been most successful in the category of Memory Test, winning 4 medals. It is followed by Fancy-Dress Competition
 with 2 medals.

Sources
Techno India Group prospectus.

Co-educational boarding schools
Primary schools in West Bengal
High schools and secondary schools in West Bengal
Balurghat
Educational institutions established in 2007
2007 establishments in West Bengal